My Mother's Eyes is an album by vocalist Etta Jones which was recorded in 1977 and released on the Muse label.

Reception

The AllMusic review by Scott Yanow stated "Although by the mid-1970s she had already been a professional singer for 30 years, Etta Jones was in reality just entering her musical prime. Having developed her individuality gradually through the years, she was heard at her very best during her long string of Muse recordings".

Track listing
 "The Way You Look Tonight" (Jerome Kern, Dorothy Fields) – 4:50
 "Don't Misunderstand" (Gordon Parks) – 6:12
 "Be My Love" (Nicholas Brodszky, Sammy Kahn) – 5:50
 "You Do Something to Me" (Cole Porter) – 4:44
 "My Mother's Eyes" (Abel Baer, L. Wolfe Gilbert) – 5:49
 "This Girl's in Love with You" (Burt Bacharach, Hal David) – 3:59
 "Gloomy Sunday" (Rezsö Seress, László Jávor) – 4:38

Personnel
Etta Jones – vocals
Houston Person – tenor saxophone
Sonny Phillips  – keyboards
Rufus Reid – bass
George Devans – vibraphone
Larry Killian – congas, percussion
Idris Muhammad – drums
Jimmy Ponder – guitar

References

Muse Records albums
Etta Jones albums
1978 albums
Albums recorded at Van Gelder Studio